The 1989 Toronto Argonauts finished in 2nd place in the East Division with a 7–11 record. They appeared in the East Semi-Final. This was the first season at the SkyDome for the Argos.

Offseason

Regular season
In a game against the Ottawa Rough Riders on October 9, 1989, Pinball Clemons scored his first CFL touchdown.

Standings

Schedule

Postseason

Awards and honours

1989 CFL All-Stars

References

Toronto Argonauts seasons
Toronto Argonauts
1989 Canadian Football League season by team